Ken Johnston may refer to:
Ken Johnston (journalist) (born 1952), North Irish former journalist/broadcaster
Ken Johnston (politician) (born 1950), Canadian politician in British Columbia

See also
Ken Johnson (disambiguation)